The Spruce Grove Cashspiel was an annual bonspiel, or curling tournament, that took place at the Spruce Grove Curling Club in Spruce Grove, Alberta. The tournament was one of the development series events introduced on the World Curling Tour during the 2012–13 curling season. The tournament was held in a round robin format. The tournament was started in 2012 as part of the World Curling Tour.

Past champions
Only skip's name is displayed.

Men

Women

External links

Former World Curling Tour events
Women's World Curling Tour events
Spruce Grove
Curling in Alberta